Avtar Singh Bhadana (born 17 December 1957) is an Indian politician from Faridabad in Haryana. He is a former Minister in Haryana, former MP and former MLA of Uttar Pradesh representing the Meerapur Assembly constituency as a member of Bharatiya Janata Party (BJP). He has formerly been a member of the Lok Sabha for 4 terms.

He has won from Faridabad Lok Sabha in the year 1991, 2004 and 2009 and Meerut Lok Sabha in 1999. He was defeated by Krishan Pal Gurjar in 2014 and 2019 consecutively.

Early life and education
Avatar Singh Bhadana was born on 17 December 1957 in Gurjar family in Anangpur village in Faridabad district of Haryana. His father was Nahar Singh and his mother was Ramphali Devi. Kartar Singh Bhadana is his brother.

Politics
When he was 34, he became the Member of Parliament for Faridabad. Bhadana started his political career at a very young age and also became a minister in the Haryana government while he was also an MLA and MP for six months in the Devi Lal government.

The Chief Minister  Arvind Kejriwal of Delhi also apologized to him in Court for a false claim made by chief minister.

References 

1957 births
Living people
India MPs 1991–1996
India MPs 1999–2004
India MPs 2004–2009
India MPs 2009–2014
Uttar Pradesh MLAs 2017–2022
Politicians from Faridabad
Lok Sabha members from Uttar Pradesh
People from Meerut district
Bharatiya Janata Party politicians from Uttar Pradesh
Indian National Congress politicians from Uttar Pradesh
Indian National Lok Dal politicians
Samajwadi Janata Party politicians
Rashtriya Lok Dal politicians